The 2009 Battle of Rafah was a battle, fought between the police forces of the Islamist group Hamas controlling Gaza, and the radical Islamist group Jund Ansar Allah. The fighting began on 14 August 2009 and concluded the next day. In total, 24 people were killed in the fighting, including six Hamas police officers and an 11-year-old girl, and a further 150 were wounded.

The raid
A day before the Hamas raid, Jund ansar Allah leader, Abdel Latif Moussa, declared the Islamic Emirate of Rafah, and swore allegiance to Al-Qaeda. About 100 of his fighters were seen in a video where he pledged allegiance in his base, a mosque in Rafah. The next day, Izz ad-Din al-Qassam Brigades attacked the Mosque and other bases of the group in Rafah. The fighting lasted 7 hours. It was reported, that when the Hamas reached the positions if Moussa, and Jund Ansar Allah's military commander, Abu Abdullah al Suri, they detonated themselves. About 13 Jund ansar allah fighters were killed, and 40 captured, 5 civilians were also killed, including 6 Hamas soldiers. al-Qassam brigades commander Abu Jibril Shimali, was  also killed during the battle. The group was virtually destroyed after the fighting, having both of its leaders killed, and its bases captured. It was reported that Hamas later released some of the captured.

References

Fatah–Hamas conflict
Hamas
Conflicts in 2009
Palestinian politics
2009 in the Gaza Strip
August 2009 events in Asia